Exo, the public transit agency for greater Montreal, provides local bus service through its La Presqu'Île sector within the western suburbs of Montreal that lie along the south side of the Ottawa River in the regional county municipality of Vaudreuil-Soulanges, Quebec, Canada. All bus routes connect the residents of the communities of Hudson, Vaudreuil-Dorion, Pincourt, L'Île-Perrot, Notre-Dame-de-l'Île-Perrot, Saint-Lazare and Rigaud to stations on the Vaudreuil-Hudson commuter rail line.

Bus service in this region made its debut in May 2005 through CIT La Presqu'Île when the town of Vaudreuil-Dorion started a shuttle service to the train during rush hours and was followed in 2007 by Pincourt and Hudson offering the same service. A combination of coach buses and midibuses were used in CIT La Presqu'Île's fleet. In June 2017, CIT La Presqu'Île was merged with many other agencies to form Exo, which continues to provide the same services.

Services

See also 
 Exo (public transit) bus services
 Vaudreuil-Hudson Line list of stations

References

External links
 AMT site for CITPI 
 Transit History of Montreal suburbs, Conseil Intermunicipal de Transport (CIT)

Transit agencies in Quebec
Vaudreuil-Dorion
Transport in Vaudreuil-Soulanges Regional County Municipality